Damon Rich (born 1975 in Creve Coeur, Missouri) is a Newark, New Jersey-based designer, urban planner, and visual artist known for investigating the politics of the built environment. He attended Deep Springs College and received a B.A. (1997) from Columbia College of Columbia University. His work looks at the shaping of the world through laws, finance, and politics. He explains his approach as follows: "My exhibitions function as a kind of case study or experiment; each begins with a group of investigators who know little about the subject at hand, acting as stand-ins for the general public." In 1997, Rich founded the Center for Urban Pedagogy (CUP), a New York City-based nonprofit organization that uses the power of design and art to improve civic engagement.

Rich served as the Planning Director & Chief Urban Designer for the City of Newark, New Jersey, from 2008 to 2015 where he led the design and construction of the city's first riverfront parks, was founding director of the city's first public art program, and was primary author of the city's first new zoning law since 1954. He now serves as partner with design and planning practice Hector.

Rich was the recipient of a MacArthur Genius Grant from the John D. and Catherine T. MacArthur Foundation in 2017.

References

External links
Cohen, Patricia. "Mapping a Bird’s-Eye View of Foreclosure Misery." New York Times, July 7, 2009
Adarlo, Sharon. "Newark Reintroduces Itself to River." Wall Street Journal, July 8, 2012
"La ciudad como herramienta de aprendizaje"
"Red Lines, Death Vows, Foreclosures, Risk Structures," MIT Center for Advanced Visual Studies
"Cities Destroyed for Cash," Architectural Association
Rich, Damon. "Social Skills: Interboro at P.S.1, a postscript." Domus, October 5, 2011.
Goetz, Kaomi. "Promoting Social Justice One Poster at a Time." Fast Company co.design, July 13, 2010.
http://damonrich.net/

MacArthur Fellows
1975 births
Deep Springs College alumni
American designers
Living people
Exhibition designers
People from St. Louis County, Missouri
Urban designers
Columbia College (New York) alumni